Paromius gracilis is a species of dirt-colored seed bug in the family Rhyparochromidae found mainly in the Palearctic.

References

External links

 

Rhyparochromidae